The American Staffing Association (ASA) is the trade association representing the American staffing industry. It is headquartered in Alexandria, Virginia.

History 

The American Staffing Association began in 1966 as the Institute of Temporary Services in Washington, DC. Its mission, then and now, is to advance the interests of the industry through advocacy, research, education, and the promotion of professional practices.

A driving motivation behind the association’s creation was to provide the industry with a strong national voice and to educate policy makers at all levels about the benefits of the staffing business.

The association’s first mission was to meet with the U.S. Department of Labor concerning regulations proposed by the former U.S. Employment Service (now the Employment and Training Administration). An important USES mission was to help state employment services provide job-finding assistance to job seekers and employers—functions that sometimes unfairly encroached on private-sector staffing agencies, which did not enjoy the tax-exempt status of their public counterparts.

The association went on to also establish an advocacy role at the state and local level, aided by its network of affiliated chapters, addressing proposed laws and regulations around the country each year.

Soon after its founding, to attract members the association held its first networking and education convention in 1967, followed by industry publications including a magazine and newsletter. In 1985, Congress passed a joint resolution establishing “National Temporary Help Services Week.”. ASA now announces an annual National Staffing Employee Week, which usually takes place in the second week of September. 

In 2003, ASA introduced the first of four professional certification programs. In 2016, the association celebrated 50 years of service.

The association’s name has changed over the years to reflect changes in the scope —National Association of Temporary Services (1970), National Association of Temporary and Staffing Services (1994); American Staffing Association (1999).

Training programs 
From time to time, ASA conducts industry specific training programs on anti-harassment, occupational safety and health, workforce management, etc.

Members 
The list of prominent ASA member staffing agencies in alphabetical order;

 Adecco Staffing
Aerotek
Elwood Staffing
 Kelly Services
 ManpowerGroup
 PageGroup
 Randstad Holding
Robert Half International
Volt Technical Resources
Westaff

See also
Recruitment
Employment agency
List of executive search firms

References

Human resource management associations
Organizations established in 1966
1966 establishments in the United States
Organizations based in Alexandria, Virginia